Jakub Obrovský (December 24, 1882 – March 31, 1949) was a Czechoslovak artist, sculptor and writer.

Biography

Jakub Obrovský was born in Brno-Bystrc. He studied at the School of Applied Arts in Prague with Celda Klouček, EK Liška and Stanislav Sucharda (1897-1901) and continued his studies at the Academy of Fine Arts with Max Pirner (1901-1905). In 1919 he became a professor at the Academy of Fine Arts, and later served as the rector.

Obrovský favored women's figures in his paintings, and often sculpted figures of athletes. He designed early stamps of the new Republic of Czechoslovakia: the lion escaping from its chains (28 October 1919) and the allegory of economy (1920).

In 1932 he won a bronze medal for Czechoslovakia in the art competitions of the Olympic Games for his "Odysseus" (see Art competitions at the 1932 Summer Olympics).

Obrovský died in Prague. His daughter Jana Obrovská (1930 – 1987) became a noted Czech composer.

References

External links

 profile 
 Virtual show

1882 births
1949 deaths
Artists from Brno
People from the Margraviate of Moravia
Olympic bronze medalists in art competitions
Medalists at the 1932 Summer Olympics
Olympic competitors in art competitions
Czechoslovak sculptors